is a limited express train operated by JR Kyushu in Japan. It operates between Hakata and Nagasaki on the Kagoshima Main Line and the Nagasaki Main Line. Kamome means seagull in Japanese.

As of 23 September 2022, the name was inherited by the new Shinkansen service to Nagasaki, at which point the remaining limited express services between Takeo-Onsen and Hakata were renamed Relay Kamome.

History
The Kamome name (written as "鷗") was first used from 1 July 1937 on limited express trains operating between Tokyo and Kobe. This service continued until February 1943.

The name (written as "かもめ") was subsequently revived from 15 March 1953 for use on limited express services operating between Kyoto and Hakata. This service was discontinued in March 1975 with the completion of the Sanyō Shinkansen to Hakata.

On 1 July 1976, with the electrification of the Nagasaki Main Line, services resumed (initially between Kokura and Nagasaki, later between Hakata and Nagasaki) using 485 series EMUs.

The service in its current form commenced on 23 September 2022, with the opening of the Nishi-Kyushu Shinkansen which opened from Takeo-Onsen to Nagasaki. With the Shinkansen now being the primary route to Nagasaki, Kamome services were reallocated to Shinkansen services on the newly-built Shinkansen line. This also resulted in Kamome services skipping Hizen-Kashima, a major station on the Nagasaki Main line but not on the Shinkansen, to be served by the newly-introduced Kasasagi limited express.

Nishi Kyushu Shinkansen

JR Kyushu also announced it would continue to use the name Kamome, which has been in use since 1961, for the Nishi Kyushu Shinkansen service. Most of the new Kamome Shinkansen services stop at every station between Takeo-Onsen and Nagasaki, with some services bypassing Ureshino-Onsen, with a few services only stopping at Isahaya. Between Takeo-Onsen and Hakata, the so-called Relay Kamome will continue as a non-Shinkansen train service for the foreseeable future until the Shinkansen is eventually extended to Hakata. Some Midori/Huis Ten Bosch services will also operate as an additional Relay Kamome at Takeo-Onsen styled as either Midori (Relay Kamome) or Huis Ten Bosch (Relay Kamome).

Rolling stock

Current rolling stock

Relay Kamome 

787 series EMUs 
 885 series tilting EMUs (branded Shiroi Kamome and Shiroi Sonic, since 2000)

Kamome 
 N700S Series Shinkansen (since 2022)

Former rolling stock

 485 series EMUs
 783 series EMUs(initially branded Hyper Saloon, since 1988)

Station stops

Relay Kamome

Stations in parentheses are not served by all trains.

  - -  -  - (Yoshinogari-Kōen) -  - -

Kamome

Legend:

Special stops
Balloon Saga: Some trains heading towards Nagasaki stop here during the Saga International Balloon Fiesta.

References

 JR Timetable, December 2008
 

Kyushu Railway Company
Nagasaki Main Line
Named passenger trains of Japan
Railway services introduced in 1937
1937 establishments in Japan